Elias Charalambous (born 25 September 1980) is a South African-born Cypriot professional manager and former player who played as a left back. He is the manager of Cypriot First Division side Ethnikos Achna FC .

Honours
Omonia
Cypriot First Division: 2000–01, 2002–03, 2009–10
Cypriot Cup: 1999–2000, 2004–05, 2010–11
Cypriot Super Cup: 2001, 2003, 2010

References

External links

1980 births
Living people
Sportspeople from East London, Eastern Cape
Cypriot footballers
Cyprus international footballers
South African soccer players
South African people of Greek Cypriot descent
AC Omonia players
PAOK FC players
Alki Larnaca FC players
FC Vaslui players
Karlsruher SC players
Doxa Katokopias FC players
Levadiakos F.C. players
AEK Larnaca FC players
Cypriot First Division players
Liga I players
Super League Greece players
2. Bundesliga players
Cypriot expatriate footballers
South African expatriate soccer players
Cypriot expatriate sportspeople in Greece
Cypriot expatriate sportspeople in Romania
Cypriot expatriate sportspeople in Germany
South African expatriate sportspeople in Greece
South African expatriate sportspeople in Germany
Expatriate footballers in Greece
Expatriate footballers in Romania
Association football midfielders
White South African people
Expatriate footballers in Germany
Cypriot football managers
South African soccer managers
AEK Larnaca FC managers
Soccer players from the Eastern Cape